1805, Cuirassiers Before the Charge, also known as Cuirassiers of 1805, before battle or 1805, is an 1878 painting by Ernest Meissonier depicting a line of Napoleonic cuirassiers before making a cavalry charge. It is on display at the Musée Condé, in Chantilly.

Description
This painting depicts a scene set in 1805 during the Napoleonic Wars. Two rows of cuirassiers await the signal to charge, with five non-commissioned officers in front of them also ready. They are wearing the distinctly coloured uniforms of the 12th Cuirassier Regiment. On the left, a Division General in a tail-coat and distinctive gold and scarlet sash is pointing, while addressing a cuirassier officer, probably the Colonel of the 12th Regiment. Behind them stands a trumpeter in yellow, an aide-de-camp to the Division General in a hussar-style uniform, and two more cuirassiers. On the right, a group of artillerymen are moving in front of a row of houses. In the far distance, on a hill between the second and third non-commissioned officer from the right, Napoleon can be seen and his chief of staff.

Meissonier's intention was not to depict a specific battle, but rather a celebration of the cuirassiers of the First French Empire.

Provenance
The painting was first exhibited at the Exposition Universelle of 1878 in Paris. It was bought for 275,000 francs  by the Belgian collector Prosper Crabbe, and then passed into the collection of Ernest Secrétan. In the 1889 auction of that collection, it was listed as lot 39 and bought for 199,652 francs by Henri d'Orleans, duke of Aumale. The painting was later donated, alongside the rest of his collection and property, to the Institut de France; it now forms part of the Musée Condé.

References

1878 paintings
Paintings by Ernest Meissonier
Paintings in the collection of the Musée Condé
War paintings
Horses in art
Works about the Napoleonic Wars